William A. Staples served as the fourth president of the University of Houston–Clear Lake.  He earned a bachelor's degree from Drake University (BBA 1970), a master's degree from the University of Iowa (MBA 1972), and a doctorate in business administration from the University of Houston (PhD 1977).  Prior to becoming president, he served the UHCL's School of Business as coordinator, program director, associate dean, and dean.

References

External links
 Profile at UHCL

Presidents of the University of Houston–Clear Lake
Drake University alumni
University of Iowa alumni
University of Houston alumni
Living people
Year of birth missing (living people)